Chicagoland Mystery Players was a live television series first shown on local station WGN-TV in Chicago starting in 1949, then picked up by the DuMont Television Network and first aired on the network September 11, 1949. The 30-minute show aired on Sundays at 8pm ET.

Gordon Urquhart portrayed police officer Jeffrey Hall, who examined each crime scene, questioned witnesses, and interrogated suspects. Bob Smith portrayed Sergeant Holland. The director was Bruno VeSota.

The series was one of several on DuMont that began in a local TV market before being picked up nationally. DuMont dropped the program on July 23, 1950, and it is unknown if it continued in Chicago for any time.

When the series aired on WGN-TV in Chicago, viewers were not given the solution to the crime. Instead they were told that they could find the solution in the next day's Chicago Tribune, the newspaper that sponsored the program. WGN-TV was owned by the Tribune. During its time on DuMont, the end was included as part of the program.

The June 26, 1949, episode was "Adventures of the Curious Cat", written by George Anderson.

Episode status
No episodes of the series are known to have survived.

See also
List of programs broadcast by the DuMont Television Network
List of surviving DuMont Television Network broadcasts
1949-50 United States network television schedule
This Is Music
The Music Show
Concert Tonight

Bibliography
David Weinstein, The Forgotten Network: DuMont and the Birth of American Television (Philadelphia: Temple University Press, 2004) 
Alex McNeil, Total Television, Fourth edition (New York: Penguin Books, 1980) 
Tim Brooks and Earle Marsh, The Complete Directory to Prime Time Network TV Shows, Third edition (New York: Ballantine Books, 1964)

References

External links
 
 DuMont historical website

1947 American television series debuts
1950 American television series endings
Black-and-white American television shows
DuMont Television Network original programming
1940s American drama television series
1950s American drama television series
English-language television shows
American live television series
Lost television shows
Chicago television shows